Gabriele Cattani is an Italian astronomer. Between 1994 and 1997, he has co-discovered 18 numbered asteroids together with astronomer Luciano Tesi at the Pistoia Mountains Astronomical Observatory including the main-belt asteroid 8051 Pistoria.

List of discovered minor planets

See also 
 List of minor planet discoverers

References 
 

20th-century Italian astronomers
Discoverers of asteroids

Living people
Year of birth missing (living people)